The Debut Tour was the first tour by Icelandic singer-songwriter Björk, and it mainly focused on her album Debut. She toured from 1993 to 1994. The tour was released on VHS and DVD as Vessel. A separate release, Debut Live, contains material from the 1993 MTV Unplugged performance, which features a much larger set of backing musicians, noted for their wide variety.

Opening acts 
 Ultramarine

Songs performed

Tour dates 

Festivals and other miscellaneous performances

This concert was a part of Rockwood Festival
This concert was a part of Rencontres Trans Musicales
These concerts were part of Big Day Out
This concert was a part of Pinkpop Festival
This concert was a part of The Arts Festival
This concert was a part of Glastonbury Festival
This concert was a part of Roskilde Festival
This concert was a part of Eurockéennes
This concert was a part of T in the Park
This concert was a part of Féile Festival

References

1993 concert tours
1994 concert tours
Björk concert tours